Charles Bull may refer to:

Charles Bull (politician) (1846–1906), Australian politician
Charlie Bull (1909–1939), English cricketer
Charles Livingston Bull (1874–1932), American illustrator